A regional flood and coastal committee (RFCC; was previously a regional flood defence committee, RFDC) is a type of governmental body in England and Wales through which the Environment Agency regions carry out their work on flood risk management.

The committees are made up of a chairman appointed by the Secretary of State for Environment, Food and Rural Affairs and representatives appointed by local authorities, Defra, or the Environment Agency.

References

Public bodies and task forces of the United Kingdom government
Water management authorities in the United Kingdom
Flood control in the United Kingdom